Rabòday is a rhythm of traditional dance music played to the drum and is arranged to electronic music.

Etymology
Rabòday is a name borrowed from one of the hundreds of traditional Vodou rhythms, one that is at every base of Haitian music.

Origins
Rabòday emerged in the mid-2000s and was inspired by Rasin music, which is the mixture of traditional Haitian rhythms and with pop-rock music since the 1980s. As in Rasin, Rabòday talks about society's problems. A high-octane mélange of electronic sounds, live syncopated rhythms and politically charged lyrics, Raboday music was spearheaded by Fresh La, Haitian pop singer and leader of the band Vwadèzil. It has become the defining sound of a generation of young Haitians recovering from a major natural disaster: the devastating 2010 earthquake.

Rhythm
Rabòday has a 4/4 dance rhythm.

References

Haitian styles of music
Electronic dance music genres